Admiral Sir George Nathaniel Broke-Middleton, 3rd Baronet CB (26 April 1812 – 14 January 1887) was a British Royal Navy officer.

Broke-Middleton was the second son of Sir Philip Broke, 1st Baronet, and Louisa Middleton. He entered the Royal Navy as a midshipman on 16 August 1825. On 18 December 1845, he was promoted to the rank of captain, and in 1855 took command of HMS Gladiator, seeing active service in the Crimean War. The following month he was invalided out of regular naval service. He was promoted to the rank of retired Rear Admiral on 3 December 1863, Vice Admiral on 1 April 1870 and Admiral on 22 January 1877.

On 4 February 1855, he succeeded to his older brother's baronetcy. He was appointed a Companion of the Order of the Bath (CB) in July 1855. In 1860, Broke assumed the additional surname of Middleton after inheriting the estate of his cousin, Sir William Fowle Fowle Middleton. In 1864, he served as High Sheriff of Suffolk. He died unmarried and the baronetcy became extinct.

His Suffolk estates were inherited by a niece, Lady de Saumarez, formerly Jane Anne Broke, the daughter of his brother Captain Charles Acton Broke. In 1882, she had married James Saumarez, 4th Baron de Saumarez, and the estates thus passed into the Saumarez family.

References

1812 births
1887 deaths
Baronets in the Baronetage of the United Kingdom
Companions of the Order of the Bath
High Sheriffs of Suffolk
Royal Navy admirals
Royal Navy personnel of the Crimean War
People from Nacton